Henry Finlayson Baker (30 November 1907 – 1 November 1992) was an Australian rules footballer who played with Footscray in the Victorian Football League (VFL).

Notes

External links 

1992 deaths
1907 births
Australian rules footballers from Victoria (Australia)
Western Bulldogs players